Marcin Wodecki  (born 14 January 1988 in Rybnik) is a Polish professional footballer who plays for Górnik Zabrze II as a winger.

Career
In a past he was player of RKP Rybnik, ROW Rybnik and Odra Wodzisław Śląski on loan.

References

External links
 
 

1988 births
Living people
Polish footballers
Poland under-21 international footballers
Górnik Zabrze players
Odra Wodzisław Śląski players
Podbeskidzie Bielsko-Biała players
GKS Tychy players
Odra Opole players
Siarka Tarnobrzeg players
Ekstraklasa players
I liga players
II liga players
III liga players
People from Rybnik
Sportspeople from Silesian Voivodeship
Association football forwards